Nunawading City Football Club is an Australian semi-professional association football club based in Forest Hill, a suburb of Melbourne, Victoria. Founded in 1971, the club currently competes in the NPL Victoria 3.

History

Recent History

In the 2014 season, Nunawading finished in bottom place of the Victorian State League Division 2 South-East, amassing seven points in 22 games. However due to Football Federation Victoria ranking Nunawading as one of the states elite junior clubs, they were given a licence to participate in the National Premier Leagues Victoria 2 for 2015, the second tier of football in the state. 

\Midway through 2014, Nunawading City youth player, Jake Brimmer was scouted by Liverpool FC, Liverpool scout Barry Hunter spotted him playing for the Victorian National Training Centre squad in July 2013. 

In 2015, after 20 consecutive losses, City earned its first point in the NPL2 competition on 18 July 2015, in a 0–0 draw away from home against Whittlesea Ranges. The point would prove to be the only point Nunawading earned that season, finishing the season in bottom place with a −95 goal difference, but were not relegated due to no relegation existing from NPL2 for 2014–2016.

In May 2016, Nunawading striker Emile Damey was selected in the squad for Liberia ahead of Africa Cup of Nations qualification matches. 

Nunawading City got their first win in NPL2 when it defeated Murray United 3–1 at Mahoneys Reserve on 22 May 2016. The win was City's only points for the 2016 season, finishing again in bottom place with a −92 goal difference.

Nuna signed a number of ex-A-League players for the 2017 season, including Mitch Cooper, Patrick Gerhardt, James Brown and Jason Trifiro. Cooper scored a total of 21 goals for Nunawading, who avoided relegation in 2017 with a 9th placed finished, four points above Richmond SC.

With Gerhardt, Trifiro, Jagajeet Shrestha and Cooper departing at seasons end, in October 2017, it was announced Nuna had signed NPL Victoria Gold Medal winner Massimo Murdocca for 2018. In 2018, Nuna signed A-League veteran Fahid Ben Khalfallah. Additionally former Western Sydney Wanderers midfielder Tahj Minniecon joined the club. Ben Khalfallah scored his first goal in Nunawadings third victory for the season against Melbourne City. Nuna finished the season in bottom place in NPL2, suffering relegation from the National Premier Leagues Victoria system.

Khalfallah was appointed the senior head coach for the 2019 Victorian State League Division 1 season.

First team Squad

References

External links
Official club website

Soccer clubs in Melbourne
Victorian State League teams
Sport in the City of Whitehorse
Association football clubs established in 1971
1971 establishments in Australia